Anil Kumar Agarwal(23 November 1947– 2 January 2002) was an Indian environmentalist, trained as a mechanical engineer at IIT Kanpur, worked as a science correspondent for the Hindustan Times.  He was the founder of the Centre for Science and Environment, a Delhi-based research institute currently led by Sunita Narain.

In 1987, the United Nations Environment Programme elected him to its Global 500 Roll of Honour for his work in the national and international arena. The Indian Government also honoured him with Padma Shri (1986) and Padma Bhushan (2002) for his work in environment and development.

Further reading
Agarwal, A. and S. Narain. 1982. The State of India's Environment: A Citizens’ Report, New Delhi: Centre for Science and Environment.
Agarwal, A. and S. Narain. 1989. Towards Green Villages: A Strategy for Environmentally Sound and Participatory Rural Development. New Delhi: Centre for Science and Environment.
Agarwal, A and S.Narain (eds.). 1991. Floods, Flood Plains and Environmental Myths. New Delhi: Centre for Science and Environment.
Agarwal, A. and S. Narain. 1991. Global Warming in an Unequal World. New Delhi: Centre for Science and Environment.
Agarwal, A. and S. Narain. 1992. Towards a Greener World: Should Global Environmental Management be Built on Legal Convention or Human Rights? New Delhi: Centre for Science and Environment.
Agarwal, A. (ed.) 1997. Homicide by Pesticides: What Pollution does to our Bodies. New Delhi: Centre for Science and Environment, State of the Environment Series 4.
 Anil Agarwal, The Challenges for the 21st Century, 3 February 1999 accessed at  UNEP/Grid-A official website 29 August 2006

References

 Baviskar, A. 2002.   An activist–environmentalist, Anil Agarwal, 1947–2002. Frontline 19: 2, 1 February.
 CSE   official biography.
 Forsyth, T.J. 2005. Anil Agarwal, pp. 9–14 in Simon, D. (ed.) Fifty Key Thinkers on Development, London and New York: Routledge.
 Jupiter, T. 2002.   Anil Agarwal: India’s leading environmental campaigner. The Guardian, 11 January, .

External links
 
 In memory of Anil Agarwal, MS Danish Association for International Co-operation
 Ever the Mentor, 19 December 2005 at IndianNGOs.com

Indian environmentalists
Recipients of the Padma Shri in literature & education
1947 births
2002 deaths
IIT Kanpur alumni
Indian magazine editors
Indian magazine founders
Recipients of the Padma Bhushan in other fields
Indian science journalists
Indian male journalists
20th-century Indian journalists